The athletics competition at the 2007 Pan American Games was held at the Flamengo Park and Estádio Olímpico João Havelange in Rio de Janeiro between 22 July and 29 July 2007. In the 47 events that took place, thirteen Games records in athletics were equalled or beaten at the 2007 edition.

Cuba fielded its best athletes and easily topped the medal table, winning twelve gold medals and also having the greatest medal haul overall with a total of 30. The hosts, Brazil, took second place on the table having won nine golds and 23 medals overall. The United States – continuing its tradition of fielding a far from full strength squad – had its worst performance ever in the Pan American athletics competition. With six golds for third place, it finished outside the top two for the first time in Games history (although its medal total of 24 was one greater than second-placed Brazil). Canada and Mexico were the next most successful nations, placing fourth and fifth in the medal tally, respectively.

Medal summary

Men's events

Women's events

Medal table

Participating nations

See also

2007 in athletics (track and field)
Athletics at the 2007 Parapan American Games

References
General
Biscayart, Eduardo (2007-07-23). Rio opens-up to Athletics at XV Pan-American Games
Biscayart, Eduardo (2007-07-24). Pérez retains 20km Walk title - Pan-American Games, Day One
Biscayart, Eduardo (2007-07-25). Moreno takes Hammer with 75.20 Games record – Pan-American Games, Day Two
Biscayart, Eduardo (2007-07-26). Barber takes 100m title with 11.02 – Pan American Games, Day 3
Biscayart, Eduardo (2007-07-27). Ennis-London beats Felicien in a thriller – Pan American Games, Day 4
Biscayart, Eduardo (2007-07-28). Cuba's five gold medal party – Pan-Am Games, Day 5
Biscayart, Eduardo (2007-07-29). Robles shines with rainy 13.25 – Pan-Am Games Day 6
Biscayart, Eduardo (2007-07-30). Brazilian de Almeida wins Marathon - Pan-Am Games, Final Day

External links
Official site
 Results Book (Internet Archive)

 
Pan American Games
2007
Athletics
International athletics competitions hosted by Brazil
2007 Pan American Games